HMAS Maitland is a former Royal Australian Navy (RAN) shore-based naval depot located in the Hunter area, behind Horseshoe Beach and Nobby's Beach, in , New South Wales, Australia.

Facilities
The depot was built alongside an army establishment known as Camp Shortland. HMAS Maitlandwas linked to HMAS Kuttabul, the main naval base in Sydney, and was originally known as HMAS Penguin (III). The base was renamed HMAS Maitland on 1 August 1940. Maitland had three components:
 the Australian Navy Cadets group, Training Ship Tobruk;
 Newcastle Customs House; and
 the military establishment on Shepherd's Hill.

The following ships were associated with Maitland:
 The Group 77 Minesweepers: HMAS Bermagui, HMAS Uki, and HMAS Narani; and
 The examination vessel HMAS Adele.

Maitland was decommissioned on 21 September 1946. During her operation, 56 officers and 300 sailors were trained at the facility.

See also
List of former Royal Australian Navy bases

References

External links

Maitland
Military establishments in the Hunter Region
Military installations established in 1940
Military units and formations disestablished in 1946
1940 establishments in Australia
1946 disestablishments in Australia
Former military installations in New South Wales